This is a list of episodes of the 2005-2006 Japanese tokusatsu television series Garo. The events within the television broadcast were described as being from the "Chapter of the Black Wolf". Garo lasted for 25 episodes, and included a special side story and a special two-part epilogue entitled Garo Special: Byakuya no Maju.

Episodes, Chapter of the Black Wolf


{| class="wikitable" width="98%"
|- style="border-bottom:8px solid #FFD700"
! width="4%" | # !! Title !! Writer !! Original airdate
|-|colspan="4" bgcolor="#e6e9ff"|

 Picture Book 

|-|colspan="4" bgcolor="#e6e9ff"|

 Yin Self 

|-|colspan="4" bgcolor="#e6e9ff"|

 Clock 

|-|colspan="4" bgcolor="#e6e9ff"|

 Dinner 

|-|colspan="4" bgcolor="#e6e9ff"|

 Moonlight 

|-|colspan="4" bgcolor="#e6e9ff"|

 Beauty 

|-|colspan="4" bgcolor="#e6e9ff"|

 Silver Fang 

|-|colspan="4" bgcolor="#e6e9ff"|

 Ring 

|-|colspan="4" bgcolor="#e6e9ff"|

 Ordeal 

|-|colspan="4" bgcolor="#e6e9ff"|

 Puppet 

|-|colspan="4" bgcolor="#e6e9ff"|

 Game 

|-|colspan="4" bgcolor="#e6e9ff"|

 Taiga 

|-|colspan="4" bgcolor="#e6e9ff"|

 Promise 

|-|colspan="4" bgcolor="#e6e9ff"|

 Nightmare 

|-|colspan="4" bgcolor="#e6e9ff"|

 Statue 
 
|-|colspan="4" bgcolor="#e6e9ff"|

 Red Sake 

|-|colspan="4" bgcolor="#e6e9ff"|

 Aquarium 

|-|colspan="4" bgcolor="#e6e9ff"|

 World Charm 

|-|colspan="4" bgcolor="#e6e9ff"|

 Black Flame 

|-|colspan="4" bgcolor="#e6e9ff"|

 Life 

|-|colspan="4" bgcolor="#e6e9ff"|

 Magic Bullet 

|-|colspan="4" bgcolor="#e6e9ff"|

 Engraving 

|-|colspan="4" bgcolor="#e6e9ff"|

 Heart Destruction 

|-|colspan="4" bgcolor="#e6e9ff"|

 Girl 

|-|colspan="4" bgcolor="#e6e9ff"|

 Heroic Spirits 

|-|colspan="4" bgcolor="#e6e9ff"|

 Smile 

|}

Episodes
Garo